Luthersk Ugeskrift ("Lutheran Weekly") was an ecclesiastical periodical issued from 1877 to 1893.

History and profile
Luthersk Ugeskrift was established in 1877 by Wilhelm Bugge and Johan Christian Heuch, who both later served as bishops. The headquarters was in Kristiania (Oslo). It was marked by "high church" views and purported skepticism towards lay preaching and elected congregational councils. In 1881 Michael Johan Færden replaced Bugge as co-editor; Heuch withdrew in 1889. The periodical went defunct in 1893.

References

1877 establishments in Norway
1893 disestablishments in Norway
Christian magazines
Defunct magazines published in Norway
Magazines disestablished in 1893
Magazines established in 1877
Magazines published in Oslo
Norwegian-language magazines
Weekly magazines published in Norway